Santo Antônio das Missões (Portuguese meaning "Saint Anthony of the missions") is a municipality in the western part of the state of Rio Grande do Sul, Brazil. The population is 10,050 (2020 est.) in an area of 1710.87 km2. Distance from the state capital of Porto Alegre is 534 km west and tens of kilometres east from the Argentine border but the municipality does not border since it is close.

The municipality would be partially flooded by the proposed Garabí Dam.

Bounding municipalities
São Nicolau
São Luiz Gonzaga
Bossoroca
Itacurubi
São Borja
Garruchos

References

External links
Granizo gigante de 20 de outubro de 2007
http://www.citybrazil.com.br/rs/stoantoniomissoes/ 

Municipalities in Rio Grande do Sul